The 1915 St. Louis Cardinals season was the team's 34th season in St. Louis, Missouri and the 24th season in the National League. The Cardinals went 72–81 during the season and finished 6th in the National League. The legendary Rogers Hornsby made his National League debut on September 10.

Regular season

Season standings

Record vs. opponents

Notable transactions 
 September 12, 1915: Jim Brown was acquired by the Cardinals from the Topeka Jayhawks.

Roster

Player stats

Batting

Starters by position 
Note: Pos = Position; G = Games played; AB = At bats; H = Hits; Avg. = Batting average; HR = Home runs; RBI = Runs batted in

Other batters 
Note: G = Games played; AB = At bats; H = Hits; Avg. = Batting average; HR = Home runs; RBI = Runs batted in

Pitching

Starting pitchers 
Note: G = Games pitched; IP = Innings pitched; W = Wins; L = Losses; ERA = Earned run average; SO = Strikeouts

Other pitchers 
Note: G = Games pitched; IP = Innings pitched; W = Wins; L = Losses; ERA = Earned run average; SO = Strikeouts

Relief pitchers 
Note: G = Games pitched; W = Wins; L = Losses; SV = Saves; ERA = Earned run average; SO = Strikeouts

References

External links
1915 St. Louis Cardinals at Baseball Reference
1915 St. Louis Cardinals team page at www.baseball-almanac.com

St. Louis Cardinals seasons
Saint Louis Cardinals season
St Louis